Mehmet Aziz, CBE, (September 24, 1893, Larnaca – June 17, 1991) was a Turkish Cypriot medical doctor and ordinance professor. He was the Chief Health Inspector for the British colonial Government of Cyprus in the 1930s and 1940s, and is widely credited with eradicating malaria in Cyprus. He was made a CBE by the British crown for this work in 1950.

According to the London newspaper The Times, the three-year project to eradicate malaria in Cyprus was "largely carried out by the Cypriots themselves under the skilful organization of Mr Mehmed Aziz, the island's chief health inspector, who studied with Sir Ronald Ross."

Career
Early British colonists in Cyprus had struggled to understand what caused malaria and it was not until the pioneering Scottish malariologist Ronald Ross established the connection between the disease and the anopheles mosquito that it became possible to address the problem of how the disease could be brought under control.

Ross visited Cyprus in 1913 and took the young Aziz under his wing, but attempts to eliminate malaria in Cyprus floundered due to a shortage of funds. It was not until 1946, after studying similar attempts to control the disease in Egypt,  that Aziz (by now chief health inspector for the colony) secured a grant from the Colonial Development Fund to eradicate the anopheles mosquito from Cyprus.

Aziz and his team divided the entire island up into 556 blocks, according to a grid plan. Each block could be covered by one man over a period of 12 days. The campaign began on the Karpas Peninsula and moved westward and while it lasted all traffic travelling from 'unclean' to 'clean' areas of the island had to be sprayed with insecticide. Working methodically, inch by inch, the men sprayed every area of standing water they could find, with such meticulousness it was said that even the hoof prints left by animals were treated.

The total elimantion of malaria from the island took just over three years, and by February 1950, Cyprus had become the world's first malaria-free country.

According to the American Medical Association, Aziz was "widely honored for his achievement in Cyprus, called 'the great liberator' and likened to St. Patrick for ridding his native land of a pest far more insidious than snakes." Aziz was quoted by the same journal as saying, "I was brought up in a village where sanitary conditions were bad. Many young people died who probably would have lived had conditions been better. If in the course of my service I have done something for the improvement and welfare of my country, that is the greatest pleasure I feel."

Personal life
He was married to Hifsiye. Their daughters include Türkan Aziz, who became the first chief nurse on the island, and Kamran Aziz, who was the first female Turkish Cypriot composer and pharmacist.

Aziz died in 1991, aged 98, in north Nicosia.

References 

Malariologists
Turkish Cypriot people
Cypriot medical researchers
1893 births
1991 deaths
People from Larnaca
Commanders of the Order of the British Empire